The Peak Cavern, also known as the Devil's Arse, is one of the four show caves in Castleton, Derbyshire, England. Peakshole Water flows through and out of the cave, which has the largest cave entrance in Britain.

Overview 

Unlike the other show caves in the area, Peak Cavern is almost entirely natural; the only artificial part of the cave was blasted to bypass a low tunnel that was only accessible by lying down on a boat. The cave system is the largest in the Peak District, and the main entrance is the largest cave entrance in Britain. Until 1915, the cave was home to some of Britain's last troglodytes, who lived in houses built inside the cave mouth and made a living from rope making, while the depths of the cave were known as a haven for bandits. In legend, it was where thieves' cant was created by a meeting between Cock Lorel, leader of the rogues, and Giles Hather, the King of the Gypsies.

Several passages lead from the entrance, known as "The Vestibule". The only one open to the public is "Lumbago Walk", named as traversing it requires most adults to stoop. The route continues through two main caverns, "The Great Cave" and "Roger Rain's House", and into a passage, "Pluto's Dining Room" – This is now the furthest point currently open to the public, but before 1990 the show cave extended almost twice its current length; down "The Devil's Staircase" to "Halfway House" along a raised bank path which crossed an underground stream known as "Inner Styx" via a series of four wooden bridges, under "Five Arches" to the junction of Buxton Water Sump. This section often floods in winter, and occasionally summer, which required regular clearing of debris and mending of the safety fences at the start of the tourist season in April (cave tours were not an all-year event until 1997). In the mid-1980s, there was a worldwide scare over the possible dangers of radon, a gas found to be present in this lower part of the cave and a potential issue for tour guides frequently exposed to it. This, along with the maintenance required, led to the Five Arches part of the tour being closed to the public in 1989, the same year that the BBC filmed The Chronicles of Narnia at this location. It can, however, still be accessed by cavers. There have since been efforts to return this area of cave to a more natural state by erasing the history of its show-cave past, removing the wooden bridges which had served generations of paying visitors.

From Five Arches, several routes are open to cavers. The main path, to the right, leads to "Victoria Aven", a sizeable shaft and on to "Far Sump", through which lies the Far Sump Extension. This area was first explored in 1980, but difficult access limited discoveries until routes through from Speedwell Cavern and James Hall's Over Engine Mine were opened in 1996.  This permitted further exploration, and in 1999 Titan Shaft was discovered, at  the deepest pitch in Britain.

Name
Historically the cave was known as the Devil's Arse, under which name it is described in William Camden's Britannia of 1586:

The cavern was declared to be one of the Seven Wonders of the Peak by philosopher Thomas Hobbes in his 1636 book De Mirabilibus Pecci: Being The Wonders of the Peak in Darby-shire, Commonly called The Devil's Arse of Peak.

Daniel Defoe uses the same name in his A tour thro' the whole island of Great Britain (1724–26):

and also mentions the shepherd story recorded by Gervase of Tilbury. The name of the cave was changed to "Peak Cavern" in 1880 in order not to cause offence to Queen Victoria during a visit for a concert. More recently the cave has been promoted using its older, more vulgar name. The name may have arisen because of the flatulent-sounding noises from inside the cave when flood water is draining away.

Events

The cavern has hosted concerts by Jarvis Cocker, Richard Hawley and The Vaccines. In 2013 the operators began promoting more concerts and events as a way to secure new streams of income. It was transformed into a cinema during Sheffield Doc/Fest in 2013 for a screening of The Summit attended by 500 people. The success of this event led to screenings every night during Doc/Fest 2014, including Happiness and Cave of Forgotten Dreams.

See also
Neil Moss – victim of a famous caving accident in Peak Cavern
The Devil's Point, Cairngorms, Scotland – also renamed to spare Queen Victoria embarrassment.

Notes

References

External links

For an interesting description of an excursion taken on 29 June 1827, see William Hone's Table-book.
 Peak Cavern official website (also marketed as the Devil's Arse)

Caves of Derbyshire
Show caves in the United Kingdom
Tourist attractions in Derbyshire
Tourist attractions of the Peak District